Joint Secretary to Government of India (often abbreviated as JS, GoI or Union Joint Secretary or Joint Secretary to Union of India) is a post under the Central Staffing Scheme and the third highest non-political executive rank in Government of India. The authority for creation of this post solely rests with Cabinet of India.

Joint secretary is mostly a career civil servant and is a government official of high seniority. The civil servants who hold this rank and post are either from All India Services (on deputation; on tenure, after empanelment) or Central Civil Services (Group A; on empanelment).  All promotions and appointments to this rank and post are directly made by the Appointments Committee of the Cabinet of India.

In the functioning of Government of India, a joint secretary is the administrative head of a wing in a department. Joint secretaries — on deputation — can hold senior positions at the United Nations, such as India's permanent representative to UNESCO, Conference on Disarmament.

Joint secretaries in the Union Government is analogous to Major General and equivalent ranks in Indian Armed Forces and are listed as such in the Order of Precedence. In the Department of Military Affairs of Ministry of Defence, an officer from all the three armed forces of the rank of Major General and equivalent is currently designated as Joint Secretary (Army/Navy/AirForce).

The Special Protection Group is sometimes headed by Inspector General rank, who is designated as Joint Secretary (Security) in the Cabinet Secretariat. A Principal Secretary in a state government can be deputed/posted as Joint Secretary in the center and a person in this rank can also hold the position of the Chief Secretary/Administrator of a Union Territory. Joint secretaries (GOI) rank 26th on Order of Precedence of India

History
The post of joint secretary in the Government of India was created in the 1920s. The salary of a member in this rank and post was fixed at Rs. 36,000 per annum in the 1930s. The salaries of Joint Secretary in Government of India during the British Raj was same to the Chief Secretary of United Provinces of Agra and Oudh, Punjab and Burma. As per Warrant of Precedence of 1905, joint secretaries in the Government of India were listed together with secretaries to the Government of India and ranked above of chief secretaries of provincial governments. Before the creation of post/rank of Additional secretary to the Government of India, Joint Secretary was the second highest post/rank in Indian Civil Service (British India).

In 1937, the Central Secretariat contained only seven joint secretaries, who were all members of the Imperial Civil Service. However, by 1946, the number had increased to twenty-five.

According to A. D. Gorwala, ICS, "The joint secretaries ought to in reality be what the name implies, namely secretaries for the subject entrusted to them and joined to a more senior secretary for the convenience of administrative work." Sir Richard Tottenham, ICS had once expressed "In my opinion there is, or should be, no distinction of function, but only of pay between a joint and an additional Secretary. Additional and joint secretaries should not be either cheap secretaries or expensive deputy secretaries."

During the tenure of Jawaharlal Nehru as the prime minister, the then Prime Minister's Secretariat was headed by a joint secretary. Currently, in Prime Minister's Office (India), the private secretary(ies) to Prime Minister of India is always in the rank and post of Joint Secretary to Government of India.

Powers, responsibilities and postings 

Joint secretary is the overall in charge with the necessary measure of independent functioning and responsibility of the wing of the department allocated and entrusted to him. A joint secretary in charge of Administration also exercises all administrative powers as head of the department wing of the ministry/department.

Additional secretaries and joint secretaries are responsible for filing all affidavits and responses before the Supreme Court of India.

The Prime Minister of India is the final authority on posting and transfer of officers of joint secretary level. Joint secretaries report to their divisional/departmental additional secretary, departmental secretary and ministerial/departmental cabinet minister.

Position
In the Union government, the members head department wings in the departments and ministries of the Union government, and hold positions such as chief vigilance officer (CVO),  chief administrative officer (CAO), emissaries in the foreign missions/embassies (ambassadors and ministers), Registrar General and Census Commissioner of India, Director General of Civil Aviation of India, director general of National Literacy Mission Authority, economic advisers, advisors of TRAI, Joint Directors of CBI, additional directors general (AIR and Doordarshan), board members of Staff Selection Commission of India commissioners of Taxes and Police, chief engineers in central departments.

They also hold the post of Social Secretary and Press Secretary to President of India.

Government nominated Board members in the Central Public Sector Enterprises/Public Sector Undertakings are either of the rank of additional secretary or joint secretary.

International equivalency
The rank of Joint Secretary in Government of India is analogous and equivalent to a rank in Senior Executive Service and Senior Foreign Service in United States. The rank is equivalent to Assistant Under Secretary in Senior Civil Service of Her Majesty's Home Civil Service.

In Pakistan, the rank is equivalent to Grade BPS-21 in post of Additional Secretary (Central)/Additional Chief Secretary (Provincial) in Central Superior Services.

Emolument, accommodation and perks 
 
All joint secretaries to the Government of India are eligible for a diplomatic passport. They are allotted Type-V (D-II and D-I) and Type-VI (C-II) apartments in areas like New Moti Bagh across Delhi by Ministry of Urban Development's Directorate of Estates.

The salary and emolument in this rank is equivalent to Major General and equivalent ranks in Indian Armed Forces.

Reforms and challenges 
In 2009, 20th Governor of Reserve Bank of India Bimal Jalan had voiced for posts at the level of joint secretary to be opened up to outside competition.

Non-IAS civil services have complained to Government of India because of lack of empanelment in the rank/post of joint secretary on numerous occasions. Still, According to the Seventh Central Pay Commission of India, IAS officers hold 249 out of 341 positions of Joint Secretary in the Government of India. In 2021, as per media reports the share of IAS at Joint Secretary in Government of India has fallen to 33%. Since 2017–18, IAS officers holding JS rank have now become a minority in almost all central government offices.

In 2015, Government of India modified joint secretary-level empanelment process to ensure greater uniformity, consistency and transparency. Under the prime ministership of Narendra Modi, however, the situation has slightly altered, choices for civil servants being appointed to this rank and post were from non IAS cadre. Almost half the choices for the  position have been given to Central Civil Services and All India Services (excluding IAS).

In June 2018, Prime Minister Narendra Modi announced opening up 10 posts of joint secretary (GOI) rank/post in several departments to experts in several fields through lateral entry. In 2019, Government of India short listed 89 candidates from 6000+ candidates, with an initial shortlist success rate of 1.4%.

In 2021, Government of India announced opening up 3 posts of joint secretary (GOI)  rank/post in several departments.

Notes

References

Bibliography 

 
 
 
 

Civil Services of India
Indian government officials